McGugin is a surname. Notable people with the surname include:

 Dan McGugin (1879–1936), American football player, coach, and lawyer
 Harold C. McGugin (1893–1946), American politician

See also
 McGugin Gas Well
 McGugin Tunnel